Epinotia trossulana is a moth of the family Tortricidae. It is found in western North America, from British Columbia, south through Utah to California.

The larvae feed on Abies species. They mine within needles or bundles of needles of their host plant.

External links
mothphotographersgroup

Olethreutinae
Moths of North America
Moths described in 1879